The Red Spider Nebula (also catalogued as NGC 6537) is a planetary nebula located near the heart of the Milky Way, in the northwest of  the constellation Sagittarius. The nebula has a prominent two-lobed shape, possibly due to a binary companion or magnetic fields and has an S-shaped symmetry of the lobes – the lobes opposite each other appear similar. This is believed to be due to the presence of a companion to the central white dwarf. However, the gas walls of the two lobed structures are not at all smooth, but rather are rippled in a complex way.

The central white dwarf, the remaining compact core of the original star, produces a powerful and hot (≈10,000 K) wind blowing with a speed of 300 kilometers per second, which has generated waves 100 billion kilometres high. The waves are generated by supersonic shocks formed when the local gas is compressed and heated in front of the rapidly expanding lobes. Atoms caught in the shocks radiate a visible light. These winds are what give this nebula its unique 'spider' shape and also contribute to the expansion of the nebula.

The star at the center of the Red Spider Nebula is surrounded by a dust shell making its exact properties hard to determine.  Its surface temperature is probably 150,000–250,000 K, although a temperature of 340,000 K or even 500,000 K is not ruled out, making it among the hottest white dwarf stars known.

The Red Spider Nebula lies near the constellation of Sagittarius. Its distance has been variously estimated as 1,900 light-years or, more likely, 3,000–8,000 light-years.

References

External links 
 
Red Spider Nebula at ESA/Hubble
White dwarf sends ripples through Red Spider Nebula at Space.com

NGC objects

Sagittarius (constellation)
Planetary nebulae